Amir  Muhammad may refer to:

Amir Muhammad (director) (born 1972), Malaysian film director and producer
Amir Muhammad, individual suspected of involvement in the murder of the Notorious B.I.G. (1997)
Amer Mohammad Rashid (born ), former Iraqi politician